The 1955 French Championships (now known as the French Open) was a tennis tournament that took place on the outdoor clay courts at the Stade Roland-Garros in Paris, France. The tournament ran from 24 May until 4 June. It was the 59th staging of the French Championships, and the second Grand Slam tennis event of 1955. Tony Trabert and Angela Mortimer won the singles titles.

Finals

Men's singles

 Tony Trabert defeated  Sven Davidson 2–6, 6–1, 6–4, 6–2

Women's singles

 Angela Mortimer defeated  Dorothy Knode  2–6, 7–5, 10–8

Men's doubles

 Vic Seixas /  Tony Trabert  defeated  Nicola Pietrangeli /  Orlando Sirola  6–1, 4–6, 6–2, 6–4

Women's doubles

 Beverly Baker Fleitz /  Darlene Hard defeated  Shirley Bloomer /  Patricia Ward 7–5, 6–8, 13–11

Mixed doubles

 Darlene Hard /  Gordon Forbes defeated  Jenny Staley /  Luis Ayala  5–7, 6–1, 6–2

References

External links
 French Open official website

French Championships
Championships (tennis)
French Championships (tennis) by year
French Championships (tennis)
French Championships (tennis)
French Championships (tennis)